José Antonio Torres may refer to:

 José Antonio Torres (director) (born 1973), Mexican film director, producer, and musician
 José Antonio Torres (Cuban journalist) (graduated college 1990), Cuban journalist
 José Antonio Torres Martinó (1916–2011), Puerto Rican painter, artist, journalist and writer
 José Antonio Torres (general) (1755–1812), Mexican insurgent (es)